The 2005 W-League Season is the league's 11th.

Changes from 2004 season

Name changes 
Three teams changed their name in the off-season:

Expansion teams 
Five teams were added for the season:

Teams Leaving 
One team left for the WPSL:
 St. Louis Archers
Eight teams folded after the 2004 season:
 Asheville Splash
 Calgary Wildfire
 Columbus Lady Shooting Stars
 Edmonton Aviators Women
 Montreal Xtreme
 Rhode Island Lady Stingrays
 Toronto Inferno
 Windy City Bluez.

Standings
Orange indicates W-League title and bye into W-League semifinals.
Blue indicates division title clinched
Green indicates playoff berth clinched

Central Conference

Atlantic Division

Midwest Division

Eastern Conference

Northeast Division

Northern Division

Western Conference

Playoffs

Format
Five teams from the Eastern Conference, four teams from the Central Conference and two from the Western Conference qualify for the playoffs. All match-ups are in a one-leg format.

In the Central Conference, the division champions play the second-place team from the opposite division.

In the Eastern Conference, the division champion with the best record receives a bye, and will play the winner of the teams with the 4th and 5th-best conference records. The other division champion will play the seventh-place team, and plays the winner of the third-place and sixth-place teams.

The two teams in the Western Conference will play each other to advance to the W-League Semifinals.

The regular season champion, New Jersey Wildcats, received a bye into the W-League semifinals, with the eighth-place team from the Eastern Conference receiving a playoff berth.

Conference brackets
Central Conference

Eastern Conference

Western Conference

W-League Championship bracket

See also
United Soccer Leagues 2005
2005 PDL Season

References

2005
Women
1
W
Women